The  is a national expressway in Japan. It is owned and operated by NEXCO Central.

Naming

Officially the expressway is designated as the Chūō Expressway Nishinomiya Route (from Takaido Interchange to Komaki Junction), the Chūō Expressway Nagano Route (from Takaido Interchange to Okaya Junction), and the Chūō Expressway Fujiyoshida Route (from Takaido Interchange through Ōtsuki Junction to Kawaguchiko Interchange, this section being a branch of the main route). These designations do not appear on any signage as all sections are signed simply as the Chūō Expressway.

Overview

The Chūō Expressway is a major roadway connecting the greater Tokyo and Nagoya urban areas, a role also shared by the Tōmei Expressway. While the Tōmei Expressway follows a coastal route, the Chūō Expressway follows an inland route through the mountainous regions of Kanagawa, Yamanashi, Nagano, and Gifu Prefectures, its highest point (1,015 meters above sea level) being at 157.3 km point sandwiched between the Yatsugatake Mountains and Southern Japanese Alps. In addition, a branch of the expressway in Yamanashi Prefecture known as the Kawaguchiko Route facilitates access to Mount Fuji and the Fuji Five Lakes area.

The expressway is 4 lanes for its entire length except for the section between Uenohara Interchange and Ōtuski Junction, which is 6 to 7 lanes. This section was originally 4 lanes as well, however increasing traffic volume led to the construction of a new parallel roadway for Uenohara-bound traffic, with the original 4 lanes of roadway being converted for the use of Ōtsuki-bound traffic only.

Tolls on the section from Takaido Interchange to Hachiōji Interchange are charged at a flat rate. As of April 2008 the toll on this section is 600 yen for a regular passenger car. Tolls on all other sections of the expressway are assessed according to distance travelled in the same manner as most other national expressways. Also, tolls on the section from Sonohara Interchange to Nakatsugawa Interchange are assessed at 1.6 times the normal rate to account for the high cost of constructing the Enasan Tunnel. Vehicles carrying dangerous materials are forbidden from using this tunnel and must use alternate routes.

History

December 15, 1967 - Chōfu Interchange - Hachiōji Interchange section opened.
December 20, 1968 - Hachiōji Interchange - Sagamiko Interchange section opened.
March 17, 1969 - Sagamiko Interchange - Kawaguchiko Interchange section opened.
October 5, 1972 - Tajimi Interchange - Komaki Junction section opened, connecting with the Tōmei Expressway.
September 6, 1973 - Mizunami Interchange - Tajimi Interchange section opened.
March 5, 1975 - Nakatsugawa Interchange - Mizunami Interchange section opened.
August 23, 1975 - Komagane Interchange - Nakatsugawa Interchange section opened (Enasan Tunnel opened with 2 lanes of traffic only).
May 18, 1976 - Takaido Interchange - Chōfu Interchange section opened.
September 18, 1976 - Ihoku Interchange - Komagane Interchange section opened.
December 19, 1976 - Nirasaki Interchange - Kobuchisawa Interchange section opened.
December 20, 1977 - Ōtsuki Junction - Katsunuma Interchange section opened.
November 16, 1979 - Komaki-higashi Interchange opened.
March 26, 1980 - Kōfu-Shōwa Interchange - Nirasaki Interchange section opened.
March 30, 1981 - Kobuchisawa Interchange - Ihoku Interchange section opened.
November 10, 1982 - Katsunuma Interchange - Kōfu-Shōwa Interchange section opened, completing the entire route.
November, 1984 - Tsuru Interchange opened.
March 25, 1986 - Okaya Junction - Okaya Interchange section opened.
August 28, 1986 - Connection to Higashifuji-goko Road at Kawaguchiko Interchange is completed.
September 27, 1986 - Nagasaka Interchange opened.
March 5, 1988 - Okaya Junction - Okaya Interchange section is transferred to the Nagano Expressway.
September 27, 1989 - Uenohara Interchange opened.
March 25, 1992 - Sonohara Interchange opened.
January, 1993 - Renovation of Dangōzaka Service Area completed. The Komaki-bound service area is moved 2 km closer to Tokyo, while the Tokyo-bound service area is moved to the former site of the Komaki-bound service area.
April 14, 1995 - Inagi Interchange opened.
March 24, 2002 - Futaba Junction is opened, connecting with the Chūbu-Ōdan Expressway.
March 16, 2003 - Reconstruction of the Uenohara Interchange - Ōtsuki Junction section is completed (additional lanes added, areas with sharp curves abandoned, Tokyo-bound Dangōzaka Service Area renovated, area near Ōtsuki Junction susceptible to traffic weaving eliminated).
March 19, 2005 - Toki Junction is opened, connecting with the Tōkai-Kanjō Expressway.
October 1, 2005 - Expressway management is transferred from Japan Highway Public Corporation to Central Nippon Expressway Company as a result of the privatization of the national expressway network.
October 1, 2006 - Futaba Smart Interchange opened.
June 23, 2007 - Hachiōji Junction is opened, connecting with the Ken-Ō Expressway.
December 2, 2012 - Sasago Tunnel collapses, killing nine people.

List of interchanges and features

 IC - interchange, SIC - smart interchange, JCT - junction, SA - service area, PA - parking area, BS - bus stop, TN - tunnel, TB - toll gate

Main Route 

Changing areas for snow chains
Achi PA - Sonohara IC
Hatsukari PA - Katsunuma IC
Sutama IC - Nagasaka IC (Komaki-bound)
Yatsugatake PA - Kobuchisawa IC (Two areas Komaki-bound)
Kobuchisawa IC - Suwa-minami IC
Okaya JCT - Tatsuno PA

Kawaguchiko Route 

The speed limit on the Kawaguchiko Route is 80 km/h.
To prevent confusion with the main route, kilometer markers along the Kawaguchiko Route show the distance from Takaido Interchange plus 300 (the marker at Ōtsuki Junction is 371.4 while the marker at Kawaguchiko Interchange is 393.9)

References

External links

Central Nippon Expressway Company 

Expressways in Japan
Roads in Aichi Prefecture
Roads in Gifu Prefecture
Roads in Kanagawa Prefecture
Roads in Nagano Prefecture
Roads in Tokyo
Roads in Yamanashi Prefecture